Brigands M.C. is the eleventh novel in the CHERUB series by Robert Muchamore. It was released on 4 October 2008. A blue-cover edition of which only 8,499 copies were made was also produced. The special editions were only sold in W.H.Smith in the United Kingdom. Of developing the plot Robert Muchamore said:
"I also like to mix the books up, so while The General was very much a story about CHERUB agents and training, Brigands is totally focused on the story of a boy called Dante and a huge mission to infiltrate and bring down a dangerous biker gang".

Plot
The book begins in 2003 with the death of Dante Scott's parents, older sister and brother at the hands of the Brigands M.C. South Devon President, Ralph "Führer" Donnington, after Dante's father refuses to go through with the plans to redevelop the Brigands' clubhouse, turning it into shops and flats.

After saving his eighteen-month-old sister Holly from the burning house (the Führer attempted to burn the evidence), nine-year-old Dante escapes, is put under the wing of child psychologist Ross Johnson, and is questioned by police in an attempt to convict the Führer.

On the night of the brutal killing, he was forced into a boxing match with Martin, the Führer's eldest son, and got blood on his shirt; he lies to the police, claiming that it was a nosebleed. Johnson realises that the defence solicitors could use the unreliability of his statement to clear the Führer. Much to Dante's fury, the courts decide that there is insufficient evidence to convict the Führer; and he is subsequently released.

After moving in with a foster family, a Dutch member of another Brigands chapter known as "Doods" attempts to murder Dante with a bomb inside the controller of a remote-controlled toy car on his birthday. Shaken, Dante moves in under the care of Ross again. Dante is drugged by Jennifer Mitchum (the same person that drugged James Adams in The Recruit) and is sent to CHERUB campus where he befriends Lauren Onions (soon to become Lauren Adams).

Four and a half years later, biker Neil Smith tries to join Brigands M.C., hoping to uncover evidence of alleged arms smuggling activities. The Führer unmasks Smith as undercover policeman Neil Gauche and stages a mock execution, warning the police against further investigation. Ross and Neil visit CHERUB campus and James Adams, Dante and Lauren are assigned to a mission to infiltrate the Brigands M.C. Chloe Blake is the mission controller, posing as the mother of the CHERUB agents. Dante and Lauren make friends with Joe Donnington (the Führer's younger son).

Meanwhile, James purchases a new bike and is invited on a run with the Brigands to the Rebel Tea Party, a motorcycle convention in Cambridge. On the run, the Brigands are attacked by rival gang the Vengeful Bastards and James saves the life of Brigand Dirty Dave when a member of the Vengefuls tries to stab him with a sharpened hammer. At the same time, Neil and assistant mission controller Jake McEwen attempt to uncover a £600,000 weapons deal orchestrated by the Brigands by following Nigel Connor, a biker friend of James, and his friend Julian Hargreaves.

When James gets to the Tea Party, a biker war breaks out between the Brigands and three rival gangs (the Vengeful Bastards, Satan's Prodigy and the Bitch Slappers), but James manages to escape. Meanwhile, Dante and Lauren end up at Joe's house party which is invaded by sixth formers ending in police being called after windows get broken and a fight breaks out between Joe, Dante, Lauren and the party-crashers.

After he and Nigel help the Brigands in smuggling arms into Britain, Julian gets scared and confesses to his father, who is a judge. This leads to armed police arresting McEwen and Neil, blowing the operation and McEwen assaulting a sergeant who insulted his intelligence, resulting in McEwen being forced to six months file sorting in the basement of CHERUB's mission building.

With the weapons deal blown and the CHERUB mission turning up few leads, the agents are sent back to campus. Before Dante leaves, he sneaks into the Führer's house, intent on killing him, but can't bring himself to do it and instead he carves a message into the Führer's table that implies he is a member of the Vengeful Bastards. Dante also takes an old photograph from the Führer's study of his and the Führer's families together. James gets invited to become a stripper at Dirty Dave's Devon strip club (much to Lauren, Chloe, and Dante's amusement) but refuses and leaves. James and Kerry start dating again.

Character developments
James and Kerry kiss shortly before James leaves on his mission, but decide to wait until James returns before resuming their relationship. Although while on the mission James dates a girl and sleeps with another, he tells Kerry he was faithful to her and they begin dating at the end of the book.

Lauren and Rat argue about Lauren 'flirting' with Dante after his return to campus. While on the mission, Lauren is supposed to be dating Joe Donnington, but at one point she gets drunk and kisses Dante (despite their aliases in for the mission being twins). However, when she returns to campus she resumes her relationship with Rat.

Notes

External links 
 Official page on CHERUB website

CHERUB novels
2009 British novels
British thriller novels
British spy novels
Fictional gangs
Fictional motorcycle clubs
Hodder & Stoughton books